Dmitri Dolgov is a Russian-American engineer who is the co-chief executive officer of Waymo. Previously, he worked on self-driving cars at Toyota and at Stanford University for the DARPA Grand Challenge (2007). Dolgov then joined Waymo's predecessor, Google's Self-Driving Car Project, where he served as an engineer and head of software. He has also been Google X's lead scientist.

Early life and education
Dmitri Dolgov was born in Russia and raised in Moscow. He traveled often, living in Japan for a year and attending high school in the United States before returning to Russia. Dolgov earned his Bachelor of Science and Master of Science degrees in physics and math from the Moscow Institute of Physics and Technology in 1998 and 2000, respectively, followed by a Ph.D. in computer science from the University of Michigan. He completed postdoctoral research at Stanford University.

Career
Early in his career, Dolgov worked on self-driving cars at Toyota's Research Institute and as part of Stanford's team for the DARPA Grand Challenge (2007). IEEE Intelligent Systems named him one of "AI's 10 to Watch — the Future of AI" in 2008. In 2009, Dolgov joined the original team of Google's Self-Driving Car Project, which became Waymo in 2016. He started as an engineer for Google, then became the lead scientist with Google X in 2014, before replacing Chris Urmson as the autonomous driving project's head of software in 2016. Dolgov became Waymo's chief technology officer and vice president of engineering, where he oversaw both hardware and software development. In 2018, he testified on behalf of Waymo in the company's trade secrets lawsuit against Uber, and he and then-chief executive officer (CEO) John Krafcik received American Ingenuity Awards from Smithsonian magazine. In 2021, Dolgov and Tekedra Mawakana became co-CEOs, replacing Krafcik. Dolgov focuses on the company's technology and Mawakana oversees business operations. In 2021, Pete Bigelow of Automotive News said the duo have a "somewhat unusual power-sharing arrangement", and have "developed a close working relationship and have been heavily involved in Waymo's most high-profile milestones".

He is an inventor with more than 90 patents, as of September 2018.

Personal life
Dolgov is a U.S. citizen.

Publications

See also
 List of University of Michigan alumni

References

External links
 Dmitri Dolgov at Bloomberg News
 Dmitri Dolgov at CNBC
 Dmitri Dolgov at Computer History Museum
 
 

Living people
Chief executive officers
Chief technology officers
Google people
Moscow Institute of Physics and Technology alumni
Engineers from Moscow
Russian emigrants to the United States
University of Michigan alumni
Waymo employees
Year of birth missing (living people)
1970s births